Congolese people in France consist of migrants from the Democratic Republic of the Congo and the Republic of the Congo and their descendants living and working in France.

History                 
The first Congolese people to arrive in France came later than the first African immigrants. While people from the Senegal River Valley (Senegal, Mali, Mauritania, Guinea) first arrived in the 1960s, Central Africans (chiefly from Cameroon and Congo), arrived in the 1970s. Most of them come for work or familial reunification, but there is also a large number of Congolese people who come with a statute of political asylum during the 1990s.

Notable people

References                             

African diaspora in France
Society of France

Ethnic groups in France
Immigration to France by country of origin